Bushi is mainly a traditional region and an African ethnic group in the eastern part of the Democratic Republic of the Congo (formerly Zaire); mainly located in the South Kivu province. It lies along the Mitumba Mountains and includes the administrative territories of Walungu, Kabare, Kalehe, Mwenga, Idjwi and Uvira surrounding Bukavu, which is its main city.  There are about 7-12 million inhabitants in the region speaking the Mashi or Shi language. The Bushi is also a kingdom that is organized into many localities or sub-chiefdoms. 

The Shi people, also known as Bashi, Banyabungo or Banyindu;  are exactly close neighbours of Lega; Fuliiro, Bavira and Bembe people in the southern part of South Kivu; the Banyarwanda/Barundi people in the neighboring countries, and are close neighbours of Bahunde and Banyanga people who are located in the North Kivu province.

The inhabitants of Bushi are the Shi people (Shi: Bashi, singular: Mushi) and their language is the Shi language (Mashi), a Central (Zone J) Bantu language. People are mainly farmers in this chiefdom; but there are more and more distinguished businessmen; politicians and other intellectuals from this important ethnic group of the South-Kivu region. The Mwami Desire Kabare is the King of these people.

Notes and references

Geography of the Democratic Republic of the Congo
Regions of Africa

Jean-Paul Biruru Rucinagiza, Lirangwe : chant héroïque des Bashi (Sud-Kivu, R.D.Congo) : iconographie, Presses universitaires de Lubumbashi, 2002, 252 p.

Louis Lwigulira Burume, Histoire et culture des Bashi au Zaïre : "six derniers règnes" antérieurs à 1980, Centre Protestant d'editions et diffusion, 1991, 216 p.

(en) Kusamba Chifundera, « Livestock diseases and the traditional medicine in the Bushi area, Kivu Province, Democratic Republic of Congo », in African study monographs (Kyoto), 19 (1) 1998, p. 13-34

Pierre Colle, Essai de monographie des Bashi, Centre d'Etude de Langues Africaines, Bukavu, 1971

W. d'Hondt, M. Magabe et G. Wehrmuller, La perception du rôle du père par les adolescents bashi de la ville de Bukavu, Les Cahiers du CEDAF (Bruxelles), n° 8, 1979, 19 p.

Paul Giroud et Jean Jadin, Le virus des Bashi, Bruxelles, 1955, 70 p.

Maw Liniger-Goumaz, « Les Bashi, République démocratique du Congo : bibliographie », in Journal de la Société des Africanistes (Paris), 1969, t. 39, fasc. 2, p. 233-244

Jean Hiernaux, Les caractères physiques des Bashi, Institut royal colonial belge, 1953, 47 p.
Cibasima Kangene et Murhagane Mburunge, « Poterie et boissellerie au Bushi », in Journal of Asian and African studies (Tokyo), 1991, n° 41, 1991, p. 163-166

Paul Masson, « Armes, outils et instruments de musique employés par les Shi », in Kongo-Overzee (Anvers), 24 (4-5) 1958, p. 239-255
Paul Masson, Trois siècles chez les Bashi, Musée royal de l’Afrique centrale, Tervuren, 1960, 126 p.
(en) Alan P. Merriam, « Song texts of the Bashi », in African music in perspective, Garland, New York, 1982, p. 223-238 (d’abord publié dans Zaïre, 8 janvier 1954)

(en) Alan P. Merriam, « Musical instruments and techniques of performance among the Bashi », in African music in perspective, Garland, New York, 1982, p. 169-181 (d’abord publié dans Zaïre, 9 février 1955)

Baguma Mweze, Le Mariage chez les Bashi et ses transformations récentes, Université de Paris 5, 1987 (thèse)
Dominique Mweze et Chirhulwire Nkingi, Bibliographie sur les Bashi du Sud-Kivu (République Démocratique du Congo), Facultés catholiques de Kinshasa, 1999, 172 p.

Kagaragu Ntabaza, Emigani bali Bantu / Proverbes et maximes des Bashi, Libreza, Bukavu, 1984 (4e éd.), 410 p.

Mulopo Tshingeji, Savoirs quotidiens des paysans Bashi du Kivu (Zaïre), fondements d'un enseignement agricole approprié, Institut des hautes études internationales et du développement, Genève, 1993, 303 p. (thèse)

Bishikwabo Chubaka. Le Bushi au XIXe siècle : un peuple, sept royaumes. In: Revue française d'histoire d'outre-mer, tome 67, n°246-247, 1er et 2e trimesters 1980. pp. 89-98 [archive]
https://www.radiookapi.net/2020/11/12/actualite/securite/nord-kivu-la-mutualite-bashi-majirane-exige-des-enquetes-sur-des
https://laprunellerdc.info/walikale-des-membres-de-la-mutualite-bashi-ont-ils-ete-sauvagement-assassines-par-des-miliciens-ndc-r/
https://www.radiookapi.net/2015/10/15/actualite/culture/uvira-un-festival-pour-promouvoir-la-cohabitation-pacifique-entre
https://www.radiookapi.net/2020/11/17/actualite/societe/sud-kivu-les-banyindu-en-dialogue-intracommunautaire-pour-une-paix 
http://www.congovox.com/cinq-si%C3%A8cles-des-guerres-entre-la-dynastie-rwandaise-et-le-royaume-shi